The Battle of Wassaw Sound (or the Capture of CSS Atlanta) was an American Civil War naval battle between the Confederate ram CSS Atlanta and the  ironclad monitors  and  and the gunboat USS Cimmerone (later named Cimmaron), which took place on 17 June 1863 in Wassaw Sound,  a bay in the present day state of Georgia.  Atlanta ran aground while attempting to break the Union blockade, and after a short battle surrendered to the Union forces.  Captain Rodgers became a national hero, and he was promoted to commodore and received the Thanks of Congress as a result of his decisive victory.

Background
Captain John Rodgers in Weehawken had overall command of the Union force.

Five days later, in the early evening of 15 June, Atlanta got underway and passed over the lower obstructions in the Wilmington River to get into position for a strike at the Union forces in Wassaw Sound. Webb dropped anchor at 8:00 p.m. and spent the remainder of the night coaling. The next evening ". . . about dark . . .," Webb later reported, he ". . . proceeded down the river to a point of land which would place me in 6 or 7 miles of the monitors, at the same time concealing the ship from their view, ready to move on them at early dawn the next morning."

Battle
A percussion torpedo was fitted to a long spar projecting forward from the ram's bow which Webb intended to detonate against Weehawken. During battle maneuvers Atlanta suddenly ran aground and swayed at an angle which made it difficult to shoot. Nahant had "drawn the fire" of Atlanta allowing Weehawken to draw within firing distance.

After receiving five of Weehawkens  shots, which knocked a hole in her casemate, crushed the pilot house and port shutter and severely wounded its pilots and several helmsmen, Webb was compelled to surrender immediately.  The battle lasted only a few minutes, and Atlanta became the first Confederate ironclad to surrender to the Union.  Meanwhile, the two boats escorting Atlanta sailed upriver for safety.

Aftermath
Atlanta suffered the sole fatality of the battle, as well as 16 wounded. At the time of capture, 21 officers and 124 men, including marines were taken captive. Captain Rodgers became a national hero, and received the Thanks of Congress along with a promotion to commodore.

Nahant was involved in the action but withheld fire, which later led to a Supreme Court case which determined the commander and crew of Nahant deserved participation in the prize for the captured vessel.

References

Bibliography

 

Battles of the Lower Seaboard Theater and Gulf Approach of the American Civil War
Chatham County, Georgia
Union victories of the American Civil War
Naval battles of the American Civil War
Battles of the American Civil War in Georgia (U.S. state)
1863 in Georgia (U.S. state)
Maritime incidents in June 1863
Conflicts in 1863
June 1863 events